Orville Hungerford (October 29, 1790 – April 6, 1851) was a two-term United States Representative for the 19th District in New York. He was also a prominent merchant, banker, industrialist, freemason, philanthropist, and railroad president in Watertown, New York.

Early years
The youngest of seven children, Orville Hungerford was born in Farmington, Connecticut (now Bristol) on October 29, 1790. His family claims descent from Thomas Hungerford of Hartford, Connecticut, who arrived in the New World some time prior to 1640. Orville's father, Timothy Hungerford, moved his family to Watertown Center in western New York, now part of Watertown (town), New York, in the spring of 1801.

An entry in a 1905 genealogical publication by the local historical society described the education of Orville Hungerford as follows:

Merchant
As a pioneer, needing help with his farm, Timothy Hungerford was only able to send his son to "winter schools", effectively precluding him from going to college. Not enamored with eking out a living from the land, at age fourteen Orville began working as a clerk in his brother-in-law Jabez Foster's general store in the frontier village of Burrs Mills (also known as Burrville), New York. Orville's initial job duties consisted of "sweeper, duster, office-boy and caretaker." This business was a partnership between Foster and Thomas M. Converse. While Orville watched over the store, Foster would head to Albany in mud wagons and sleighs and then make the arduous week-long trek to Manhattan via sloop to purchase supplies before returning to Watertown. Creating such a supply line between Watertown and New York would be critical in later years as well as impress upon Orville the need for solid transportation lines.

In 1807 or 1808, Jabez Foster along with Orville Hungerford moved the store to Watertown, a busier location. Orville's diligence paid off and he became Foster's partner in the firm known as Foster & Hungerford, which profited handsomely from selling supplies to U.S Army stationed at Sackets Harbor during the War of 1812.

Foster & Hungerford developed its own transportation network contracting with others to deliver its war supplies during the 2nd major conflict with the British. For example, in September 1812, Jabez Foster hired Eber Hubbard to move supplies that he and Orville Hungerford had procured on behalf of the U.S. government using Hubbard's boat to journey from "Sackett's Harbor" down the St. Lawrence River to the U.S. troops stationed in Ogdensburg, New York. British forces ended up capturing Hubbard's boat. In late 1820, Hubbard petitioned Congress to cover the loss of his boat valued between $650–800. Hubbard argued that the government agreed to reimburse Foster for any losses, which should also cover him. Unfortunately, on December 22, 1820, the Committee of Claims in the House of Representatives disagreed that any contractual protections for Foster would implicitly extend to Hubbard.

In 1813, Foster became a judge in the Court of Common Pleas for Jefferson County, while Hungerford decided to focus on expanding his commercial interests rather than reading law. He set up his own store, eventually partnering with Foster's son-in-law Adriel Ely, only withdrawing his interest upon entering Congress.

Orville had his children work in the family store. For example, his son Richard Esselstyne Hungerford served as a clerk in the store before heading off to Hamilton College in Clinton, New York (Class of 1844). There Richard joined his cousin, John N. Hungerford, who also worked in his older brother's store, Hungerford & Miner, before going to Hamilton College and then becoming a banker and finally a U.S. Congressman.

Hungerford made frequent trips to New York City to sell potash from his ashery in Watertown and purchase wares to bring back to his store. On October 6, 1840, the New York Herald newspaper announced that Orville Hungerford arrived the previous day at the Franklin House hotel, located at the northwest corner of Broadway and Dey Street in New York City.

Orville Hungerford endorsed modern conveniences. For example, he helped fellow merchants promote the "Air-Tight Rotary Cook Stove", which used one third less wood, as advertised in local newspapers such as the Northern State Journal.

On May 13, 1849 a great fire swept through Watertown, N.Y., burning down 100 buildings valued at $125,000. A large portion of the downtown business district was destroyed. Only four dry goods stores survived including one owned by Orville Hungerford and another by his former business partner Adriel Ely.

Family
On October 13, 1813, Orville Hungerford married Elizabeth Porter Stanley, known as Betsey or sometimes spelled Betsy, whose family was originally from Wethersfield, Connecticut. Betsey was the daughter of George and Hannah (Porter) Stanley. She was 5 years older than her husband when they met in the midst of the War of 1812.

The couple had the following children: Mary Stanley (May 6, 1815 – Mar. 13, 1893), Marcus (Aug. 30, 1817 – Sep. 3, 1863), Martha B. (Nov. 30, 1819 – Sep. 21, 1896), Richard Esselstyne (Mar. 28, 1824 – Jan. 5, 1896), Frances Elizabeth (Feb. 8, 1827 – Nov. 25, 1902), Grace, and Orville F. (Feb. 25, 1830 – Nov. 26, 1902.)

Betsey also raised her nephew Moses Hopkins Stanley, who was born in Great Barrington, Massachusetts (Nov. 1807 – April or May 1856).

Orville Hungerford's success was a direct result of the support given by his wife Betsey: "She was a woman of beautiful character and disposition, and an efficient colaborer with her revered husband in all his benevolent works."

Banker

Because Jefferson County, New York was expanding in the early nineteenth century due in part to the development of the Eire Canal from 1817 to 1825, farmers and businessmen there needed greater access to capital. In 1816, Jabez Foster, who was Orville's brother-in-law and mercantile business partner, along with others successfully petitioned the legislature to establish the Jefferson County Bank. Foster was chosen to help apportion stock and choose the building location, which was a contentious matter because each community in the area wanted the bank to be located there. As a compromise, the bank ended up being housed in a brick Georgian colonial mansion on Church Street in the village of Adams, New York. The bank was initially capitalized with $50,000.00, of which half the amount was paid in. However, the bank did not fare financially well in Adams. Pursuant to an act passed on November 19, 1824, the bank relocated to Watertown and the capital fund was increased to $80,000.00.

Jabez Foster served as the second president of the Jefferson County Bank (1817–1819) and later resumed the office for a short period (1825-1826) after Bank President Ethel Bronson died. Orville served as bank cashier (1820–1833) and later as bank president (1834–1845). In turn, Orville hired his nephew Orville V. Brainard first as a bank teller and then as his replacement as cashier, a position Brainard held for 33 years.

As cashier of the Jefferson County Bank, Orville Hungerford and bank president Jabez Foster presented to the New York State Assembly the following fiscal report dated March 3, 1821: $98,833.03 owed to the bank, $57,870 of capital stock paid in, $4,096.84 owed by the bank, and $34,185.35 of bank notes in circulation.

Dr. Isaac Bronson, an early investor in the Jefferson County Bank, served as a surgeon on George Washington's staff during the Revolutionary War before turning to a career in finance that made him a fortune estimated at his death in 1838 to be $1,500,000 of monied securities. One of his chief investments was the Bridgeport Bank in Connecticut, where he served on the Board of Directors from 1806 to 1832. Because of competition in Manhattan driving down interest rates there, Dr. Bronson began loaning money in more rural places such as Jefferson County, New York, where he could get a higher rate of return.

Dr. Bronson engaged his brother Ethel Bronson to sell his investment lands in Jefferson County. Ethel Bronson served as President of the Jefferson County Bank from 1820 through his death in 1825, appointing Orville Hungerford as cashier of the bank beginning in 1820. As a physician turned banker, Dr. Isaac Bronson instructed Hungerford in his capacity as cashier to adhere to stringent banking standards such as "make the bills of the bank always at par in New York [City] by redeeming [there]; another, never to renew a note for a customer, until the original was paid up; and a third, to refuse to discount paper having over ninety days to run." By adhering to this sound money lending regime, at least for a while, Hungerford was able to maintain the bank's high profits, which made it one of the best bank investments in the state. Isaac Bronson ended up making a large profit on his sale of stock in the Jefferson County Bank.  In 1824, the Wall Street investment bank Prime, Ward & King, which was headed by Nathaniel Prime, purchased from Bronson half the capital in the Jefferson County Bank.

As a financial institution, the Jefferson County Bank accepted promissory notes, a common form of debt that could be passed on to another person or entity for collection. On May 14, 1825, a man by the name of Heath made a promissory note for $150 with interest, which James Wood from Brownville, New York indorsed. In June 1826, the Bank took the matter to court and ended up getting a judgment against Wood in his capacity as a surety. On appeal, Wood argued that Jefferson County Bank was not a proper corporate body and that its cashier Orville Hungerford reached  an agreement with Heath to collect security from him if Wood failed to pay. Hungerford made this deal on his own and then went to the Bank's Board of Directors for approval, but they failed to formally adopt a resolution on the matter. The appeal court found that the Bank was properly established and that Hungerford's deal was not a defense to being on the hook for guaranteeing payment, i.e., Wood had to pay up. Hungerford continued on as cashier for the bank.

In 1828, fellow dry goods merchant, Loveland Paddock purchased a large number of shares in the Jefferson County Bank and joined the Board of Directors.

In February 1837, an aggrieved director of the Jefferson County Bank filed a complaint with the New York Assembly that other bank directors showed favoritism by "knowingly, indirectly, [giving] more than 250 shares to one person in violation of the law increasing said capital of bank." In their defense, the accused bank directors claimed that the legislative committee running the investigation had familial connections to those making accusations and that the committee was holding secret sessions in which biased witnesses were examined. As bank president, Orville Hungerford stayed behind the scenes while others were the public face of the counterattack. It was a wise decision because Orville was subpoenaed to testify about the stock distribution. According to one contemporary source, this complaint to the Assembly was really a power play to oust him from his position. In the end, Hungerford subtly beat back his opponents by having his allies present letters as part of the record that focused on the unfairness of the proceedings. Hungerford continued on as bank president.

The Watertown Directory for 1840 lists only two banks, both located along Washington Street: The Jefferson County Bank capitalized at $200,000 and the Bank of Watertown capitalized at $100,000. The Watertown Directory for 1840 also showed Orville Hungerford as president of the Jefferson County Bank along with his nephew Orville Velora Brainard as his cashier and his other nephew Solon Dexter Hungerford as his teller. Interestingly, the individual page for Orville Hungerford in the Watertown Directory for 1840 lists his occupation as "merchant".

On December 19, 1845, Orville Hungerford testified as a witness in the federal criminal case United States vs. Caleb J. McNulty, stating the following: "I was president of Jefferson county Bank when elected to Congress, and resigned before I came here."

In late 1847, Orville Hungerford, who resumed his presidency of the Jefferson County Bank after his political career ended, initiated a lawsuit against the powerful Wall Street financial firm Prime, Ward & Co. for squandering the bank's money by speculating in the flour market. The New York trial court had granted Hungerford a judgment of $70,000. The Jefferson County Bank, which was later joined by other creditors, asked the court to issue Stillwell warrants, which caused the sheriff to arrest Edward Prime, Samuel Ward (lobbyist), and John Ward based on the legal theory that they were about to remove their assets in the United States to pay creditors in England. The defendants attempted to quash the warrants based on lack of jurisdiction and insufficient affidavits, but were unsuccessful. The Jefferson County Bank's attorney in the lawsuit, George C. Sherman, who was also a director of the Bank, mercilessly questioned one of the defendants, resulting in the recovery of some bank funds.

Throughout the entire nineteenth century, the Jefferson County Bank, nationally chartered in 1865, never defaulted on its obligations and from 1824 paid its shareholders regular dividends. To put its growth in perspective: in 1821 it had resources of $91,000.00; by January 1, 1916, it had resources of $3,000,000.00. In 1916, Orville's grandson, Orville E. Hungerford, was vice-president of the bank.

Orville Hungerford was one of the founders of the Bank of Watertown, which was capitalized at $100,000, and began operations on January 26, 1839. Loveland Paddock also helped found the Bank of Watertown.

Investor

Orville Hungerford played an important role in the industrialization of the Watertown, New York, by investing his capital to help others start local ventures. For example, Hungerford helped establish the Sterling Iron Company, Black River Woolen Company, and the Jefferson County Mutual Insurance Company.

In 1824, Orville Hungerford purchased the Oakland House, a hotel in Watertown, New York, which he then sold to Lewis Rich in 1847.

On Monday, January 9, 1839, the New York Assembly read a petition from Orville Hungerford and ninety others, seeking to extend the Black River Canal, a feeder for the Erie Canal, all the way up to Lake Ontario or the St. Lawrence River.

Beginning in the 1840s, building a plank road became a popular way to facilitate transportation routes, and several were planned to be built in Watertown and its environs. Orville Hungerford and his nephew Orville Velora Brainard were instrumental in funding and incorporating the Watertown and Sackets Harbor Plank Road Company.

Homestead

Orville Hungerford's first home was framed out of wood with a piazza in front and on the side on Washington Street, near what is now Clinton Street in Watertown, New York. The original owner, Pedi Wells, built this dwelling next to the house of Orville's sister Hannah Hungerford Foster and her husband Jabez Foster.

In 1823, Orville Hungerford began to construct the largest house in Watertown on a piece of property that he purchased in 1816 for $500.00 from Olney and Eliza Pearce. In front was a "glorious" English garden laid out to Orville's specifications. The outer walls of the home were made out of native limestone. The inside had 10 fireplaces to keep the occupants warm. An ox team hauled the "black Italian marble mantel" from Albany. A large carriage house was built out back. Construction on the main house continued through 1824. On November 11, 1825, Orville opened the six-paneled door with a brass eagle-knocker at 336 Washington Street and moved into his mansion.

The John Losee House, built circa 1828, located at the 2020 address of 17100 County Route 155 in Watertown, New York, is very similar in design and construction to Orville Hungerford's dwelling. The National Park Service entered the John Losee House in the National Register on February 1, 2014. In support of its requested designation, the National Register of Historic Places Registration Form filed in December 2013 stated the following:

Similarly, in 2016, the National Park Service entered the Norton-Burnham House in Henderson N.Y. into the National Register of Historic Places by relying on the cited architectural reference points of both the Orville Hungerford Homestead and the John Losee House.

The English ivy-covered Hungerford residence eventually passed to Orville's daughter, Frances E., a spinster, whose estate conveyed it to her niece Helen Hungerford (Mrs. Leland G. Woolworth). After Helen died, ownership of the house transferred to her sister Harriet Hungerford, another spinster. Harriet had been living next door in her father Marcus Hungerford's house at 330 Washington Street. She moved into the Orville Hungerford mansion in 1946 and lived there until her death on October 26, 1956. By this time most of the family had moved out of the Watertown area and no one wanted to return. The Watertown National Bank bought the property from Harriet's estate and sold it to Joseph Capone, a developer. In turn, John R. Burns, purchased the structure and reassembled the house minus the left-wing several blocks away on Flower Avenue West, where it still stands.

As of 2020, the house is in remarkably good shape due to the loving care and modernization efforts of its recent owners, including Ann E. Philipps, Esq. At present, the old Hungerford homestead on Washington Avenue is the site of a Best Western Carriage House Inn, attached out back to the original carriage house.

Military service
During the War of 1812, Orville Hungerford and his brother-in-law Jabez Foster supplied the U.S. Army in Sackets Harbor, N.Y. as well as surrounding military posts. In 1817, Orville was appointed as a second lieutenant in the Fourteenth regiment of cavalry in the militia of Jefferson County. In 1821, Orville succeeded Captain Jason Fairbanks and was also on the staff of Major General Clark Allen. In 1822, Orville was appointed the Quartermaster of the Twelfth Division of infantry for Jefferson County.

Freemason
As early as 1818, Orville Hungerford was a member of the Freemasons at Watertown Lodge No. 289 in Watertown, New York. In 1826, Hungerford along with his business partner, Adriel Ely, and others applied for a dispensation to establish a local Encampment of Knights Templar. On February 22, 1826, the Deputy Grand Commander of the Grand Encampment, Oliver W. Lownds, granted the dispensation. Hungerford presided as Grand Commander from March 24, 1826, until April 17, 1829, during which time twenty-nine men had the Order of the Temple conferred upon them.

However, the 1826 disappearance of William Morgan (anti-Mason), who threatened to publicize the secrets of Freemasonry, caused the public to lash out at the secretive organization. In 1829, a Boston Masonic newspaper, citing the Watertown Freeman publication, reported that a mere 69 people marched through the city to protest the abduction of Morgan when hundreds were expected.

Hungerford began working his way up the New York chapter of the Royal Arch Masons. This chapter was organized March 14, 1798 with future New York governor DeWitt Clinton elected as its first Grand High Priest. In 1826, 1827, and 1828, Hungerford was elected to the office of "The Grand King" in the Royal Arch Masons. On September 14, 1826, Hungerford attended the 6th meeting of the General Grand Royal Arch Chapter of the United States in New York City as a representative of the New York State Grand Chapter.

In 1830, a number of prominent masons such as Orville Hungerford and his political mentor Perley Keyes signed the following public defense of their fraternal organization:

Due to continued public condemnation of freemasonry, however, Sir Orville Hungerford's encampment would go dark in 1831. In February 1850, after the furor abated, Hungerford and others successfully petitioned the Grand Encampment of New York to reissue their former warrant, thereby establishing Watertown Commandery No. 11.

On January 16, 1826, Hungerford bought from Hart Masey a three-story brick building on Washington Street in Watertown, which housed the Eastern Light Lodge No. 289. The deed to the building had a covenant to secure the use of a 40 by 42.5 room on the third floor for the Masons. During the height of the Morgan affair uproar, the Lodge operated in secret, communicating to members by placing a lighted candle in certain windows. In 1834–35 the Eastern Light Lodge failed to hold annual elections; the concomitant failure to collect dues resulted in forfeiture of the charter, which was reinstated in 1835 upon a successful petition to the Grand Lodge. The Washington Street building was destroyed in a fire on January 27, 1851, and the Eastern Light Lodge moved temporarily to an Odd Fellows Hall and then to several other locations.

In 1838, Orville Hungerford was elected high priest of Watertown Chapter No. 59 of the Royal Arch Masons, which received its New York charter on February 7, 1817. Hungerford carried on as high priest for three years. During his tenure, he created 14 members.

Orville Hungerford continued his involvement with freemasonry while serving in Congress. Diarist Benjamin B. French stated: "As a Freemason, [Hungerford] was a constant visitor to our Chapters and Lodges in the District, and never declined any duty that he was asked [to] perform." In 1850, Hungerford was elected to the position of Deputy Grand High Priest of the Grand Chapter State of New York, Royal Arch Masons. In 1851, Hungerford became the 15th Grand High Priest of the Grand Chapter State of New York, Royal Arch Masons. Marcus Hungerford, the son of Orville, would join Watertown Lodge, No. 49.

Community service

Fire was always a threat in frontier communities. In 1816, Orville Hungerford's brother-in-law Jabez Foster was elected as one of the fire wardens in the Village of Watertown. When Orville was younger he often followed Foster's lead, especially since the two became partners running a store. The Village of Watertown trustees passed a resolution on May 28, 1817, proposed in part by Orville Hungerford, to form a fire company. What became known as the Cataract Fire Company then paid $400 for a fire engine, half of which the Village covered with the other half contributed by businesses and professionals.

Orville was actively involved in his community, making a point to give back and help those less fortunate. One of the big problems then and now was poverty. As a result, Jefferson County established a poor house system paid for by appropriations from each town. In 1826, Hungerford was appointed as one of the first superintendents of the poor house located on the 150-acre Dudley Farm in Le Ray, New York. People sent to the poor house would have a place to live and would be provided with food and rudimentary medical care in exchange for some work, usually tied in with farming, e.g., picking oakum.

His concerns also focused on local infrastructure, benefitting the entire community. For example, Orville played a key role in incorporating the Watertown Water Company in 1826 to supply fresh water "by means of aqueducts" to the village of Watertown. In 1849, Hungerford once again took a leading role to help raise $50,000 in capital stock on behalf of the Watertwon Waterworks Company to supply the "village of Watertown with pure and wholesome water." According to a contemporary historical source, neither of these ventures produced water.

Not all of Orville's aid was limited to Jefferson County, New York. During the Greek War of Independence from 1821 to 1830 the Ottoman government massacred Greek civilians. The English poet Lord Byron joined in the quest to liberate Greece from Ottoman rule with tragic results. In the United States, the Executive Greek Committee of New York formed to provide relief to Greek civilians affected by the conflict. The citizens of Jefferson County met in Watertown, New York on December 19, 1827 "for the purpose of devising means and raising funds for the relief of the oppressed and suffering Greeks." As a result, the meeting attendees formed a committee, appointing Vincent Le Ray de Chaumont as its chairman and Orville Hungerford as its secretary. In 1827, Orville is credited with raising $135.55 on behalf of the Executive Greek Committee of New-York, which helped fund the cost of shipping supplies to the distressed Greek inhabitants.

Orville Hungerford had a reputation for giving back to society as well as doing the right thing. On August 1, 1828, a man by the name of Barney Griffin, who had travelled from Syracuse to the Village of Sackets Harbor several days earlier, ended up dying in the Jefferson County Poor House. Orville went over to investigate. Upon searching Griffin's clothes, he found the cash sum of two hundred and twenty-two dollars and fifteen cents – more than enough money for Griffin to pay for a hotel. Hungerford put an advertisement in a paper to see if a relative would claim the money. No one did. He then turned the money over to the County Treasurer for use of the Poor House, deducting a dollar for the advertisement money that came out of his own pocket. Understanding the nature of greed, he asked the County Board of Supervisors to indemnify him for his actions, which it agreed to do.

Even though Orville only had a rudimentary education, he strongly believed that an industrializing society needed more advanced schooling for its youth. Orville contributed towards the education of the young women of the Jefferson County, New York area by working with Dr. John Safford to promote the Watertown Female Academy in 1823. Dr. Safford and Orville's own daughters were the beneficiaries of this effort as both Susan M. Safford and Martha P. Hungerford were early students of the school taught by Gen. "Fighting Joe" Hooker's sister Sarah R. Hooker. The Watertown Female Academy "had a high reputation, and did much toward encouraging similar enterprises throughout the country", but ended up closing in 1837.

On March 28, 1828, Orville and his political mentor, Perley Keyes, as well as several others, successfully prompted the legislature to pass an act to incorporate the Jefferson County Agricultural Society, which was established at a meeting in Watertown, New York in 1817. Keyes was appointed a vice-president of the Society and Hungerford, due to his financial skills, became the treasurer. In 1841 Hungerford became president. His nephew and understudy, Solon Dexter Hungerford, also served as president of the Society in 1854 and 1877. As of 2020, the Jefferson County Agricultural Society, based in Watertown, N.Y., is still in existence and claims to be the "oldest continuous operating fair in America."

Prior to 1832 the only school for boys in Watertown, New York stopped at the district level, i.e., middle school. There was no academic high school in the area. As a result, Orville Hungerford and other prominent figures such as Jason Fairbanks and Loveland Paddock established the "Watertown Academy," which opened its doors on September 19, 1832. The two-story stone schoolhouse with basement was located on Academy Street in Watertown.

In 1833, Hungerford's brother-in-law and former business partner, Jabez Foster, sold the County some land near Watertown for $1,500.00 on which to build a new poor house. Hungerford and two others were tasked with setting up the new establishment.

On September 16, 1839, at the Agricultural Show and Fair of Jefferson County "[a]n able and admirable address was delivered by the [Society] President, O. Hungerford, Esq. It abounded with plain, practical remarks, and was listened to with interest by a crowded auditory."

The Northern State Journal reported that the State Agricultural Society appointed Hungerford as one of the judges for "domestic manufactures" at the New York State Fair, which would take place in Saratoga Springs, New York on September 14–16, 1847.

Politician

 Orville's friendship with local politician, fellow mason, and judge, Perley Keyes, piqued his interest in politics. Keyes was a stalwart of the Democratic party and led its political machine in Jefferson County, New York. Orville looked upon Keyes as his mentor and would take over the reins of power. One of Keyes's primary lessons was that a successful candidate needed to be supported by a newspaper. In 1824 until his death in 1833, Keyes supplied the financial backing to publish the Watertown Freeman. That newspaper evolved into the Eagle and Standard, whose editor Alvin Hunt, enthusiastically endorsed the political ambitions of Orville Hungerford and his Democratic ticket throughout northern New York.

Orville Hungerford started his political career at the local level and worked his way up the governmental ladder. In the first Village of Watertown, New York election in May 1816, Hungerford, 26 years old, was elected as one of three assessors. By 1823, Hungerford was elected President of the Village of Watertown Trustees. He continued to be elected President of the Village of Watertown Trustees in 1824, 1833, 1834, and 1835 as well as serve as one of the five Village of Watertown Trustees in 1840 and 1841. In 1850, Marcus Hungerford, the son of Orville, served a single term as one of the Village of Watertown Trustees.

In the summer of 1832, "Asiatic cholera" spread throughout the country, including the North Country of New York, terrifying the inhabitants. As a result, numerous meetings were held in the Village of Watertown as well as surrounding towns and villages to institute sanitary measures. On June 25, 1832, Orville Hungerford was appointed with others to the newly established board of health to oversee local measures to quash the invisible killer.

Orville Hungerford served on the Board of Supervisors for the Town of Watertown, New York (later becoming the City of Watertown by legislative act on May 8, 1869) for the following terms: 1835–37, 1841–42, and 1851 until his death.

On November 8, 1836, Hungerford was appointed by his district as a presidential elector.

In September 1839, U.S. President Martin Van Buren visited Jefferson County, riding in a carriage with Orville Hungerford and his brother-in-law and former business partner Jabez Foster, followed by a procession almost a mile long, from Madison Barracks in Sackets Harbor to Watertown.

In 1842, as a Democrat, Hungerford was elected to the 28th and two years later to the 29th U.S. Congress. In his second term, due to his extensive business background, Hungerford served on the powerful Committee on Ways and Means. He supported a tariff on imported goods, which earned him the enmity of Southern Democrats, who were in favor of free trade. His fellow party members offered to nominate him as Vice President of the United States if he would switch his vote on protectionism. However, Hungerford could not be swayed because he wanted to shelter the emerging manufacturing sector from the cheaper wares of Great Britain and other more industrialized European countries.

Orville Hungerford often followed the political lead of his mentor, Judge Perley Keyes, a "dextrous lieutenant[]" of one of the founders of the Democratic Party, Martin Van Buren. In 1814–1815 and 1816–1817, Keyes and Van Buren served together in the New York State Senate. Keyes died in 1834, leaving his political connections and loyalties to his protege. In September 1843, Orville Hungerford attended the Democratic Party's New York State Convention, which gathered at Syracuse, New York, to choose delegates for its National Convention that would be held the following year in Baltimore, Maryland. Hungerford was appointed as a delegate who would endorse former U.S. President Martin Van Buren as the presidential candidate in the election of 1844. Van Buren, known as the "Little Magician" and "Sly Fox" as well as "Martin Van Ruin", failed to gain the nomination.

On March 27, 1844, Orville Hungerford voted in favor of House of Representatives Bill No. 265, which would allow freemasons to incorporate a Grand Lodge in the District of Columbia.

In a letter dated December 30, 1844, Orville Hungerford, who often clashed with Southern politicians, wrote to Watertown, N.Y. lawyer and N.Y. State Senator George C. Sherman, stating "The Rabid Texians started fiercely to drive annexation through without consulting the North, expecting us to swallow the doctrine avowed in the correspondence, that Slavery is right in the abstract. They however begin to discover that the whole nation is not disposed to swallow that doctrine, and again that all are not disposed to assume all the debts of that Territory."

When Congress was in session in 1845, Hungerford boarded at Mrs. Hamilton's house off of Pennsylvania Avenue between 4½ and 6th Streets in Washington. By February 11, 1846, Hungerford moved his Congressional residence in the capitol to Mrs. Cudlipp's boarding house off of Pennsylvania Avenue between 3rd and 4½ West Streets.

Hungerford was unafraid of voicing his opinion even if unpopular with his fellow politicians from the same party. Throughout his life, Orville believed in finishing the task at hand before taking a break. When the U.S. House of Representatives conducted business Orville sat in his assigned seat towards the back of the chamber. Representative William Lowndes Yancey, the ardent Southern supporter of slavery, sat several seats over to the rear. Yancey was not to be trifled with in that he fought a duel with Thomas Lanier Clingman, a fellow member of the U.S. House of Representatives.

The Congressional Globe, which covered proceedings of the 29th Congress, noted on page 413 of Volume 15 the following relevant entry for February 21, 1846:

Hungerford's clash with Congressman Yancey received regional newspaper coverage. For example, the Richmond Enquirer, a Virginia newspaper, published a summary of the incident on the front page, center column, of its February 27, 1846 morning issue.

In 1846, Hungerford lost his Congressional seat to a Whig party candidate.

Before the 29th Congress ended on March 3, 1847, Hungerford was able to manifest his disdain for slavery, which was dividing the nation. Crossing party lines Hungerford voted with the Whigs on February 16, 1847 and on March 3, 1847 to endorse the Wilmot Proviso, which added to the "$3,000,000 bill" a provision excluding slavery from territories newly acquired by treaty. A local Watertown newspaper, Northern State Journal, reported his yeah vote in the House of Representatives in favor of the Proviso. 

Yet Hungerford still yearned for political power. In 1846, the amended New York Constitution allowed the New York State Comptroller, who was responsible for auditing the state books, to be elected by the citizenry as opposed to being appointed by the legislature. Hungerford saw this office as a stepping stone to either the governorship or the U.S. Senate before seeking even higher office. In October 1847, the bitterly divided delegates known as Barnburners and Hunkers gathered at the Democratic State Convention in Syracuse and nominated Orville as the "Hunker" candidate for the state office of comptroller. His defeated barnburner opponent was Azariah C. Flagg, the current New York State Comptroller. The split in the Democratic party resulted in such bitterness that the barnburners resorted to calling the victor "Awful Hunkerford." Such factionalism tremendously weakened the Democrats.

At the next general election in 1847, Millard Fillmore received 174,756 votes for the office of N.Y. Comptroller while Orville Hungerford obtained 136,027 and Lewis Tappan 10,408. Ironically, Millard Fillmore used to work for Orville's first cousin Benjamin Hungerford. Benjamin had a wool-carding and cloth-dressing mill in West Sparta, New York and had convinced Millard's father to have the fifteen-year-old boy learn the trade under his tutelage as an apprentice. According to Millard, Benjamin had him chop wood for a coal pit instead of working in the shop. The two got into an argument about job duties. Benjamin approached the boy, asking if he felt abused because he had to chop wood. Millard, who was standing on a log with an ax raised, uttered: "If you approach me I will split you down." Benjamin Hungerford relented and let Millard work in the shop for the agreed-upon three-month term before walking home alone. The bitter experience of working for Benjamin Hungerford made Fillmore's victory over Orville for comptroller thirty-four years later extra sweet. In 1850, Millard Fillmore became the 13th President of the United States.

After the comptroller election defeat, Hungerford grew tired of the partisanship in Washington, D.C. and the stress from being away from his family and business interests. He decided to return to Watertown, New York to complete his railroad project, which he started in 1832. Hungerford, drawn to the challenge of expanding economic opportunity, likely would have re-entered politics after the rails were laid that brought prosperity to Jefferson County. But his unexpected death at age 61 precluded this outcome. A late 19th-century historian stated the following:

Railroad President
After his shot at higher political office ended, Orville Hungerford began to refocus his energies on establishing the Watertown & Rome Railroad. The Erie Canal was opened in 1825 and many in the North County thought it unnecessary to develop a new mode of transportation to move goods and people. In the early 1830s, Clarke Rice thought otherwise and built a miniature model train, which he and William Smith displayed in the upper floor of a house on Factory Street in Watertown, New York. Clarke believed that steam power on rail would supersede steam power dependent on a waterway. Clarke convinced his fellow masonic brother and the area's premier business person, Orville Hungerford, that Watertown was doomed as a backwater without a more modern connection to the commercial hub of the country, New York City. After all, the roads out of Watertown were slow and even slower in the rain and snow.

In 1922, Edward Hungerford, author of several railroad books, described the magnitude of considering the adaptation of the latest transportation technology, barely tested, in a still remote area of the country:

In 1832, merchant Orville Hungerford and fellow railroad enthusiast Major Edward Kirby took the stage coach from Watertown at an early hour to eventually connect with a packet boat on the Erie Canal in Utica, New York and then make many additional stops until finally reaching New York City. A railroad would shorten this 4-day journey considerably. 

On April 17, 1832, the New York legislature incorporated the Watertown & Rome Railroad, naming Hungerford as one of its commissioners charged with promoting the line. Although, the initial act called for track to be laid within three years and the line to be completed within five years, a shortage of capital forced the promoters to seek extensions of the charter in 1837, 1845, and 1847 at which point Orville was elected its first president.

Hungerford played a key role in raising the necessary capital to complete the railroad. A notice in a Watertown newspaper dated May 5, 1847 stated the following:

In the summer of 1847, the Board of Directors voted to allocate $500 so that Hungerford and three other railroad directors could travel to Boston and New York City to meet investors and solicit stock subscriptions.

In 1848, Orville Hungerford and Major Edmund Kirby from Brownville, N.Y. managed to raise enough capital via subscriptions to complete the railroad, which cost $15,000 a mile to build. Hungerford then began placing advertisements in regional newspapers soliciting bids from contractors for grading, bridging, and masonry services along with the provision that "[t]estimonials in regard to the character and responsibility of the persons proposing, who are not known to the undersigned or chief or resident engineers, will be required." Actual work on the railroad began on the Rome, N.Y. end of the line in November 1848. Orville then acted as the first superintendent for the railroad overseeing the construction.

The Watertown & Rome Railroad commissioned the Taunton Locomotive Works in Taunton, Massachusetts to manufacture its first engine, Pierrepont, which was delivered September 7, 1850. The Taunton Locomotive Works delivered the next engine Rome on November 20, 1850. The Taunton Locomotive Works delivered another engine Adams on February 5, 1851. Prior to 1854, the Watertown & Rome Railroad also purchased an engine Northstar delivered by the Taunton Locomotive Works to the Connecticut River Railroad on July 5, 1848.

Unfortunately, Hungerford never got to see a train complete a journey to Watertown because he died shortly before the inaugural run on May 29, 1851, covering the 53-mile stretch between Rome to the hamlet of Pierrepont Manor (originally called Bear Creak). The Hon. William C. Pierrepont, who owned the property where the railroad initially ended, followed Orville as president. At 11:00 p.m. on September 5, 1851, the first train steamed into the temporary passenger station on Stone Street in Watertown.

The railroad posthumously named its fifth engine, Orville Hungerford, in honor of its first president. Delivered to the railroad, on September 19, 1851, this engine, built by William Fairbanks in Taunton, Massachusetts, was twenty-one and a half tons in weight.  Furthermore, the board of the railroad, appreciative of Orville Hungerford's efforts, provided free annual train passes to his widow Betsey Hungerford and their daughters.

By December 1856, the railroad stretched 97 miles, "terminating at Rome upon the Erie Canal and N.Y. Central R.R., and at Cape Vincent upon the St. Lawrence River, in good order, with ample accommodations at each end, in the way of storage ground, docks, warehouses, elevator, and with sufficient equipment for a large and profitable traffic." For the year ending 1856 the Railroad earned $440,290.63 and dispersed $219,218.34.

Richard Esselstyne Hungerford, an 1844 graduate of Hamilton College, later served his father's railroad for 17 years as secretary, treasurer and paymaster of what became know as the Rome, Watertown & Ogdensburgh Railroad.

Interests
Hungerford's primary interests consisted of making money so that he could support his political aspirations as well as fund his many philanthropic endeavors. Along with his Watertown, N.Y. business partners Adriel Ely and Orville V. Brainard, Hungerford was a member of the American Art Union, which established an admission-free art gallery at 497 Broadway in New York. Among other benefits, the annual dues of $5 entitled subscribers to receive a copy of an engraving of an American painting. Hungerford's nephew and business understudy, Solon Dexter Hungerford, was an honorary secretary of the organization.

Death
After a 12-day illness starting out as "bilious cholic", which then affected his brain in the form of paralysis, Orville Hungerford died on Sunday morning at 9:30 a.m. on April 6, 1851. Such illness was said to run in the family. The Otsego Democrat newspaper in Cooperstown, N.Y. stated that the cause of his death was "apoplexy", i.e., the archaic term for stroke.

The Reformer newspaper of Watertown, New York, reported the following:

Hungerford's death was reported throughout the state of New York as well as nationally. On April 9, 1851, the most widely circulated newspaper in New York City, The New York Herald, published by James Gordon Bennett Sr., reported under its "Deaths of Distinguished Persons" entry that Orville Hungerford's "loss will be seriously felt." On April 15, 1851, The New York Herald published a more in depth obituary, stating Orville Hungerford's "public reputation, doubtless, rests mainly on his talents as a financier."

Jefferson County, New York, especially the business interests, mourned the passing of Hungerford. The Board of Directors of the Watertown and Rome Railroad Company held a special meeting on April 8, 1851 to discuss the untimely death of Hungerford, resolving "[t]hat the members of this Board attend the funeral in a body, and wear crape on the left arm thirty days, as further testimony of respect for the memory of their deceased President." Similarly, on the morning of April 9, 1851, the Merchants of the Village of Watertown gathered at Paddock Arcade, the second oldest indoor shopping mall in the country, resolving to "close our stores from 10 to 2 o'clock, and attend the funeral of our deceased brother and friend, in a body."

Hungerford had a Christian burial, which was in keeping with his position for many years as President of the Jefferson County Bible Society. His funeral service was held in the First Presbyterian Church, which he helped fund and rebuild, across the street from his house on Washington Avenue in what is now the City of Watertown, New York.

The pastor at the funeral service gave a sermon that touched upon the difference Orville made in his community:

Orville was then buried several miles away in a humble grave near his parents and siblings in the "Old Grounds" on the former Sawyer Farm in what is now the Town of Watertown, New York. In 1854, his son Richard Esselstyne Hungerford spent $256 to purchase a lot in the contiguous and recently established Brookside Cemetery, so that the family could erect a mausoleum. At the time, the price of a wooded lot in the  Brookside Cemetery was set at eight cents per square foot. Orville's body would be reinterred there on the south side of the crypt in 1860. The gothic structure, made from bird eye limestone and brownish cast stone, is supported by twelve pier buttresses, punctured by trefoil windows on each side, and graced with an octagonal spire sheathed in slate.

In the coming years, more than eighty family members would be buried in this beautiful cemetery, which was being increasingly graced with ever more elaborate monuments. Trying to be like his father, who served on numerous committees, but not nearly as ambitious, Richard Esselstyne Hungerford became vice-president of the prestigious Brookside Cemetery Association. His son, Richard Ely Hungerford, served as a trustee of the Brookside Cemetery Association at the end of the nineteenth century.

Orville's wife, Betsey, the matriarch of the family, died on September 17, 1861. Betsey was interred alongside her husband in the Hungerford mausoleum in Brookside Cemetery. A woman of faith, Betsey was a member for life of the American Bible Society. A Watertown Village newspaper stated the following in her obituary: "In her death the church has lost one of its brightest ornaments, one whose piety was never doubted, whose zeal knew no abatement, whose contributions in all the departments of Christian benevolence were as constant an unremitting as they were noble and generous."

Retrospect
In many respects, Orville Hungerford, known for his honesty and industriousness, epitomized the self-made man of the nineteenth century. The New York Herald, a newspaper with one of the largest readerships in the country, ended up publishing a full obituary for Orville Hungerford, concluding that "[h]is public reputation, doubtless, rests mainly on his talents as a financier." Decades after his death, a journalist recalled that "[Orville] had rare financial talents, and was a first-class business man."

In July 1908, Jeannette Huntington Riley noted in a letter written for a history of the Adriel Ely family that "Orville Hungerford was a dignified and some might have said a cold, stern man; but to me, only a young girl, he was always exceedingly kind. I am always proud to say I had an uncle who went to Congress when it meant something!" She also noted that his wife, her "aunt Betsey, [was] the sweetest--no other word would express her character."

Most of Hungerford's descendants moved away from Watertown in the twentieth century when industrial malaise struck the region. His memory, however, is still kept alive by some of his scattered family members. Through his granddaughter's progeny - Helen Mary Hungerford Mann - he is honored by having his name bestowed on four generations of males, including eminent attorney, Orville Hungerford Mann Sr., from Nyack, New York.

In 2008, Eleanor Ebbighausen formed the Whitney-Hungerford chapter of the National Society United States Daughters of 1812 in Watertown, N.Y., in part honoring Orville Hungerford because "[h]e was in the mercantile business and gave money, food, dry goods, clothing, guns and gunpowder to support the local militia."

A January 2019 article in the Watertown Daily Times newspaper and its website nny360.com, described a water leak in the roof of the Jefferson County Historical Society in Watertown, N.Y., which damaged a portrait of Orville Hungerford. The article went on to report the following: "Christine E. Godfrey, curator of collections for the society, said she will find out how much repairing the Orville Hungerford painting will cost. She hopes to talk to the Hungerford family to see if they would be willing to help."

References

External links 
 	

 
 Orville Hungerford at Political Graveyard
	

1790 births
1851 deaths
People from Bristol, Connecticut
Politicians from Watertown, New York
American railroad executives
19th-century American railroad executives
Democratic Party members of the United States House of Representatives from New York (state)
19th-century American politicians